The National Book Awards Children's Book of the Year Award is a British literary award, given annually to works of children's literature as part of the Galaxy National Book Awards. It was established in 1996, replacing the British Illustrated Children's Book of the Year and British Children's Author of the Year categories.

It is currently sponsored by W H Smith, although previously it has been sponsored by Red House (who also sponsor the Red House Children's Book Award). Previously called the "British Children's Book Award", it was renamed to Children's Book of the Year in 2010.

Shortlisted works and winners

1996
The Hutchinson Treasury of Children's Literature edited by Alison Sage

1997
Philip Pullman, Northern Lights by Philip Pullman

1998
Harry Potter and the Chamber of Secrets by J.K. Rowling

1999
Harry Potter and the Philosopher's Stone by J.K. Rowling

2000
The Illustrated Mum by Jacqueline Wilson

2001
The Amber Spyglass by Philip Pullman

2002
Artemis Fowl by Eoin Colfer

2003
Girls in Tears by Jacqueline Wilson

2004
The Curious Incident of the Dog in the Night-Time by Mark Haddon

2005The Gruffalo's Child  by Julia Donaldson and Axel Scheffler

2006
 Ark Angel by Anthony Horowitz (winner)
 I, Coriander by Sally Gardner
 SilverFin by Charlie Higson
 Eldest by Christopher Paolini
 ...and that's when it fell off in my hand by Louise Rennison
 Wizardology: The Book of the Secrets of Merlin by Douglas Steer

2007
 Flanimals of the Deep by Ricky Gervais (winner)
 The Boy in the Striped Pyjamas by John Boyne
 The Incredible Book Eating Boy by Oliver Jeffers
 Peter Pan in Scarlet by Geraldine McCaughrean 
 Wintersmith by Terry Pratchett
 Horrid Henry and the Football Fiend by Francesca Simon (author) and Tony Ross (illustrator)

2008
 Horrid Henry and the Abominable Snowman by Francesca Simon (author) and Tony Ross (illustrator) (winner)
  That's Not My Penguin by Fiona Watte
 Katie Price's Perfect Ponies by Katie Price
 Born to Run by  Michael Morpurgo 
 Kiss by Jacqueline Wilson

2009
 Breaking Dawn by  Stephenie Meyer

2010
 Zog by  Julia Donaldson and Axel Scheffler

2011
 A Monster Calls by Patrick Ness

2012
 Ratburger by David Walliams

2013
 Demon Dentist – David Walliams

2014
 Awful Auntie – David Walliams

2015–2016
 No award

2017
 The Girl of Ink & Stars - Kiran Millwood

2018
 The Lost Words by Robert Macfarlane and Jackie Morris — The Hate U Give - Angie Thomas (joint winners)

2019The Ice Monster by David Walliams

2020
 A Good Girl's Guide to Murder by Holly Jackson

British Children's Author of the Year
The British Children's Author of the Year Award was given annually to authors of children's literature as part of the British Book Awards. It was established in 1990 and awarded for the last time in 1995. During 1996 both the British Book Awards both it and the Illustrated Children's Book of the Year award were replaced by the Children's Book of the Year category.

Winners

1990
 Roald Dahl

1991
 Anne Fine

1992
 Dick King-Smith

1993
 Raymond Briggs

1994
 Anne Fine

1995
 Janet and Allan Ahlberg

British Illustrated Children's Book of the Year
The British Illustrated Children's Book of the Year Award was given annually to illustrated works of children's literature as part of the British Book Awards. It was established in 1991 and awarded for the last time in 1995. For the 1996 British Book Awards both it and the Children's Author of the Year award were replaced by the Children's Book of the Year category.

Winners

1991The Mousehole Cat by Nicola Bayley

1992Farmer Duck by Martin Waddell (ill. Helen Oxenbury)

1993Penguin Small by Mick Inkpen

1994Mummy Laid An Egg by Babette Cole

1995The Amazing Pop-Up Science Book'' by Jay Young

Children's Book Award
British children's literary awards
Awards established in 1996
1996 establishments in the United Kingdom
Annual events in the United Kingdom